Nyaudoh Ukpabio Ndaeyo (born 25 March 1961) is a Nigerian professor of farm systems and the current vice chancellor of University of Uyo.

Background 

Ndaeyo hails from Ini local government area of Akwa Ibom State and was born on 25 March 1961. He is married with two children.

Education 
Ndaeyo holds a doctor of philosophy degree in farm systems and master's degree in agronomy both from the University of Ibadan. He had his first degree also in agronomy from the University of Uyo with an Ordinary National Diploma in agriculture from the College of Agriculture, Obubra.

Career 
Ndaeyo served as head of the department, dean faculty of agriculture, chairman committee of deans and deputy vice-chancellor. He is a professor of farm systems and was appointed as the 8th substantive vice-chancellor of University of Uyo on 6 October 2022.

References

1961 births
Living people
Vice-Chancellors of Nigerian universities
Academic staff of the University of Uyo